Luis Isaac (born June 19, 1946 in Rio Piedras, Puerto Rico) is a former Minor League Baseball player and coach. As a player, he was a catcher in the minor leagues from 1962 through 1979; he batted and threw right-handed. He is well known for his large, well-groomed mustache.

He spent 16 seasons on the coaching staff of the Cleveland Indians mainly as the bullpen coach. He was fired by the Indians on September 30, .

References

External links

1946 births
Living people
Chattanooga Lookouts players
Kingsport Pirates players
Cleveland Indians coaches
Cleveland Indians scouts
Major League Baseball bullpen coaches
People from Río Piedras, Puerto Rico